Chap va Rast (also Romanized as Chap va Rāst; also known as Chap Rāst) is a village in Abanar Rural District, Kalat District, Abdanan County, Ilam Province, Iran. At the 2006 census, its population was 51, in 9 families. The village is populated by Lurs.

References 

Populated places in Abdanan County
Luri settlements in Ilam Province